Miyobe or Soruba is an unclassified Niger-Congo language of Benin and Togo.

Güldemann (2018) notes that Miyobe cannot be securely classified within Gur, and leaves it out as unclassified within Niger-Congo. Unlike the Gur languages, which are SVO, Miyobe has SOV word order like the Senufo, Mande, and Dogon languages.

Geographic distribution
In Togo, Miyobe is spoken in the Solla area of Binah Prefecture.

In Benin, Miyobe is spoken in Atacora Department (Boukoumbé and Kouandé communes) and Donga Department (Copargo commune). Villages are Anandana, Kuhobè, Sétrah, Kantchoko (Kapatcharè), Tchomitchomi, Koubéné-Béné, Koutchamang, and Moupémou villages.

References

Gurma languages
Languages of Benin
Languages of Togo